Alex de Minaur defeated Jenson Brooksby in the final, 6–3, 6–3 to win the singles title at the 2022 Atlanta Open. It was de Minaur's second Atlanta title, the first being in 2019.

John Isner was the defending champion, but lost in the quarterfinals to Brooksby.

Seeds
The top four seeds received a bye into the second round.

Draw

Finals

Top half

Bottom half

Qualifying

Seeds

Qualifiers

Lucky losers

Qualifying draw

First qualifier

Second qualifier

Third qualifier

Fourth qualifier

References

External links
Main draw
Qualifying draw

Atlanta Open - Singles
2022 Singles
Atlanta